Langyashan, named after the nearby Mount Langya, is a town of Yi County in southwestern Hebei province, China, located in the Taihang Mountains  southwest of the county seat. , it has 20 villages under its administration.

See also
List of township-level divisions of Hebei

References

Township-level divisions of Hebei
Yi County, Hebei